Gymnoscelis smithersi is a  moth in the family Geometridae. It is found on Norfolk Island.

References

External links

Moths described in 1977
smithersi